Livry may refer to:

Places in France  
Livry, Calvados
Livry, Nièvre
Livry-Gargan, in the Seine-Saint-Denis department
Livry-Louvercy, in the Marne department
Livry-sur-Seine, in the Seine-et-Marne department

People  
Emma Livry (1842–1863), French ballerina
Henri de Livry (1884-1979), French actor known for Notre Dame van de sloppen, Histoire vraie and Dropped from Heaven
François Sanguin de Livry (fl. 1720), French ambassador to Poland
François-Hyppolite Sanguin, marquis of Livry (18th century), who built the Château de Bénouville

Other uses 
Gare de Livry-sur-Seine, a station on the Transilien Paris-Lyon railway line
Canton of Livry-Gargan, a canton of the Seine-Saint-Denis department